Naadu Adhai Naadu is a 1991 Indian Tamil-language drama film,  directed by Ramathilaga Raajen and produced by M. Visalakshi and S. Visalakshi. The film stars Ramarajan, Rupini, Rami Reddy and Chitra.

Cast

Ramarajan
Rupini
Chitra
Rami Reddy
Goundamani
Senthil
Samikkannu
Sethu Vinayagam
 Karikol Raju
Usilai Mani
Typist Gopu
Pasumani
Boopathi
T. K. S. Natarajan
Sivaraman
Vellai Subbaiah
Karuppu Subbiah
Banudhasan
A. A. Nathan
Periya Karuppu Thevar
Anuja

Soundtrack
Music composed by Deva, and lyrics written by Kalidasan.

References

External links
 

1991 films
Films scored by Deva (composer)
1990s Tamil-language films